Placeres Airport  is an airport serving the Uruguay River town of Bella Unión in Artigas Department, Uruguay.

See also

 List of airports in Uruguay
 Transport in Uruguay

References

External links
 HERE Maps - Bella Unión
 OpenStreetMap - Placeres Airport
 Landings - Bella Unión Airport
 

Airports in Uruguay
Buildings and structures in Artigas Department